Collaborative writing, or collabwriting is a method of group work that takes place in the workplace and in the classroom. Researchers expand the idea of collaborative writing beyond groups working together to complete a writing task. Collaboration can be defined as individuals communicating, whether orally or in written form, to plan, draft, and revise a document. The success of collaboration in group work is often incumbent upon a group's agreed upon plan of action. At times, success in collaborative writing is hindered by a group's failure to adequately communicate their desired strategies.

Definition 
Collaborative writing refers to a distributed process of labor involving writing, resulting in the co-authorship of a text by more than one writer.
 Interaction between participants throughout the entire writing process. Whether it be brainstorming, writing a draft of the project, or reviewing.
 Shared power among participants. Everyone included in the project has the power to make decisions and no group member is in charge of all the text produced.
 The collaborative production of one single and specific text.

Collaborative writing is often the norm, rather than the exception, in many academic and workplace settings. Some theories of collaborative writing suggest that in the writing process, all participants are to have equal responsibilities. In this view, all sections of the text should be split up to ensure the workload is evenly displaced, all participants work together and interact throughout the writing process, everyone contributes to planning, generating ideas, making structure of text, editing, and the revision process.  Other theories of collaborative writing propose a more flexible understanding of the workflow that accounts for varying contribution levels depending on the expertise, interest, and role of participants.

History 
In Rhetoric, Composition, and Writing Studies, scholars have demonstrated how collaborative learning in U.S. contexts has been informed by John Dewey’s progressivism in the early twentieth century. Collaboration and collaborative writing gained traction in these fields in the 1980s especially, as researchers reacted to poststructuralist theories related to social constructionism and began theorizing more social views of writing.

Types   
Collaborative writing processes are extremely context-dependent. In scholarship, on both academic and business writing, multiple terminologies have been identified for collaborative writing processes, including:

 Single Author writing or Collegial: one person is leading, they compile the group ideas and do the writing.
 Sequential writing: each person adds their task work then passes it on for the next person to edit freely.
 Horizontal Division or Parallel writing: each person does one part of the whole project and then one member compiles it.
 Stratified Division writing: each person plays a role in the composition process of a project due to talents.
 Reactive or reciprocal writing: group all works on and writes the project at the same time, adjusting and commenting on everyone's work.

Uses of collaborative writing 
Collaborative writing may be used in instances where a workload would be overwhelming for one person to produce. Therefore, ownership of the text is from the group that produced it and not just one person.

In 2012, Bill Tomlinson and colleagues provided the first extensive discussion of the experiential aspects of large-scale collaborative research by documenting the collaborative development process of an academic paper written by a collective of thirty authors; their work identifies key tools and techniques that would be necessary or useful to the writing process, and to discover, negotiate, and document issues in massively authored scholarship. 

In 2016, Researchers Joy Robinson, Lisa Dusenberry, and Lawrence M. Halcyon conducted a case study investigating the productivity of a team of writers who utilized the practice of interlaced collaborative writing and found that the team was able to produce a published article, a two-year grant proposal, a digital and physical poster, a midterm research report, and conference presentation over the course of three years. The writers used virtual tools such as Google Hangouts' voice feature for group check-ins, to hold group discussions, and to write as a group. Google Docs was used to allow each team member to edit and add writing to a shared document throughout the writing process.

Another motive for using collaborative writing is to increase the quality of the completed project by combining the expertise of multiple individuals and for allowing feedback from diverse perspectives. Collaborative writing has been proven to be an effective method of improving an individual's writing skills, regardless of their proficiency level, by allowing them to collaborate and learn from one or more partners and participate in the co-ownership of a written piece. Instructors may utilize this technique to create more student-centered and collaborative learning environments, or they may use it themselves to cross-collaborate with other academics to produce publishable works.

Views on collaborative writing 
Linguist Neomy Storch, in a 2005 Australian study, discovered that reflections pertaining to collaborative writing in regards to second language learners in the classroom were overwhelmingly positive. The study compared the nature of collaborative writing of individual work versus that of group work, and Storch found that although paired groups wrote shorter texts, their work was more complex and accurate compared to individual works. The study consisted of 23 total participants: 5 doing individual work and 18 working in pairs. The pairs consisted of two male pairs, four female pairs and three male/female pairs. Post-assignment interviews revealed that the majority of students (16) yielded positive opinions about group work, but two students felt that group work is best reserved for oral activities and discussions rather than writing assignments. The majority of interviewees gave positive reviews, but one argued that group work was difficult when it came to criticizing another's work and another argued that there is a power imbalance when writing is based on ability. The two students who were stark opponents of collaborative writing revealed that it was hard to concentrate on their work and they were embarrassed by their supposedly poor English skills.

Jason Palmeri found that when it came to inter-professional collaboration, most of the issues stemmed from miscommunication. In differing disciplines, one person may have a level of expertise and understanding that is foreign to another. Palmeri's study provided the example of a nurse and an attorney having different areas of expertise, so therefore they had differing understanding of concepts and even the meaning of the same words. While much of the issues resulted from miscommunication, the study found that some nurse consultants resisted change in terms of altering their writing style to fit the understanding or standards of the attorneys.

Collaborative writing as an educational tool 
Collaborative writing is a technique used by educators to improve the writing skills of students. This method can assist writers of all ages and levels of proficiency to produce texts of a higher quality with students having a generally positive view of the assignment. Typically, collaborative writing in a classroom setting differs from cooperation or peer-review in that it is defined by the co-authorship of the participants, meaning the students contribute equally at all stages of the writing process to produce the final project.  Collaborative writing requires cooperation, which causes more language related episodes through assigning tasks, comparing ideas, and revising the text. It typically results in more accurate language usage, and it can even improve oral fluency and confidence in speaking in the target language. Students also feel higher levels of motivation to complete the task due to the group interaction. 

Scholarly research featuring the practice of collaborative writing in educational settings began in the early 1900s with a focus specifically on language acquisition. Researchers found that the language exchanges used by participants to generate the texts were beneficial, and they called these language related episodes. This is because learners could socialize in their first language or the language they were learning while deliberating ideas, justifying linguistic choices, and negotiating meaning, allowing for students to learn from each other and forcing them to analyze choices. While worksheets seem to focus on linguistical structures, such as conjugation, collaborative writing focuses on the lexis. The co-creative nature of this knowledge allows for it to be maintained. Even if parts of the conversing is in the students' primary language during these group interactions, evidence shows that the actions are transactional and brief with a focus on bettering the target language.

The grouping of the students is significant. Larger groups seem to produce better texts and have more language related episodes. Students in groups of low proficiency will have fewer language related episodes and focus on meaning, while students with higher proficiency will have more language related episodes and focus on grammar. It is still beneficial to pair students of high proficiency with students of low proficiency because they will have more language related episodes. However, it is most effective to pair or group students with similar proficiency levels because they will engage more with each other and with the collaborative writing task. Teacher-chosen groups and student-chosen groups seem to result in the same collaborative patterns, but teacher chosen groups will have more language related episodes and result in a higher quality of final text.  Following that, students collaborate the most in face-to-face settings opposed to using to online formats with collaborative tools.  Surprisingly, one study shows that even silent group members who do not contribute to the discussion or the task completion still benefit from collaborative writing through observing the exchanges from their peers. 

Some students may prefer individual writing since the process is more linear and less time-consuming with fewer opportunities for distractions. A student's view on collaborative writing may also be shaped by their experiences. If there are more transactional experiences, such as adding or deleting text with no group deliberation, students will likely prefer to work alone. Likewise, the final text will typically lack synthesis because there was not a collaborative relationship within the group.  Generally, higher amounts of group discussion results in a more positive view on the collaborative writing assignment. Students may still chose not to collaborate or contribute to the task due to a lack of confidence in their language skills and may dislike collaborative writing as a result.

Collaborative Writing in the Workplace 
A study conducted by Stephen Bremner, an English professor at the City University of Hong Kong, investigated eight business communication textbooks to test the depth in which they provided students with a knowledge of collaborative writing in the workplace and how to execute those processes. The study found that, generally, textbooks highlighted the role of collaborative writing in the workplace. Textbooks listed the pros of collaborative writing such as saving time, more superior documents due to each individual's strengths and specialized knowledge, a well-crafted message due to team work, balanced abilities, and an interest in accomplishing a common goal.

The article claimed that the textbooks examined gave students a basic knowledge of collaboration in the workplace, but they also lacked the information that showed students the realities of collaborative writing in the workplace with few activities presented in the textbooks that mirror collaborative activities in the workplace. Much of the activities that featured group work seemed more idealistic rather than based in reality, where the writing process occurred in only controlled and orderly environments. Bremner also found that group work in the classroom also did not properly simulate the power hierarchies present in the workplace.

Jason Palmeri found that when it came to inter-professional collaboration, most of the issues stemmed from miscommunication. In differing disciplines, one person may have a level of expertise and understanding that is foreign to another. The article gave the example of a nurse and an attorney having different areas of expertise, so therefore they had differing understanding of concepts and even the meaning of the same words. While much of the issues resulted from miscommunication, the article claimed that some nurse consultants resisted change in terms of altering their writing style to fit the understanding or standards of the attorneys.

Tools
 Atlas is a wiki-like git-managed authoring platform from O'Reilly Media that is based on the open source web-based Git repository manager (version control system) "GitLab".
 For collaborative code-writing mostly revision control systems like Team Foundation Version Control (used in Team Foundation Server) and Git (used in GitHub, Bitbucket, GitLab and CodePlex) are used in parallel writing.
 Collaborative real-time editors like Etherpad, Hackpad, Google Docs, Microsoft Office, and Authorea.
 Online platforms mainly focused on collaborative fiction that allow other users to continue a story's narrative such as Protagonize and Ficly.
 Wikis like Wikipedia and Wikia

Authorship 

An author acquires copyright if their work meets certain criteria. In the case of works created by one person, typically, the first owner of a copyright in that work is the person who created the work, i.e. the author. But, when more than one person creates the work in collaboration with one another, then a case of joint authorship can be made provided some criteria are met.

See also 

 Collaborative editing
 Content management system (CMS)
 Document collaboration
 Document management system
 Job sharing
 Joint authorship
 Mass collaboration
 Networked book
 New Worlds Project
 Online word processors
 Project management
 Real-time text

References

Further reading 
 Paul Benjamin Lowry's papers on collaborative writing.
 Lisa S. Ede, Andrea A. Lunsford (1991). "Singular Texts/plural Authors: Perspectives on Collaborative Writing".

Collaborative writing
Writing